Sereus, Serenus, or Severus was the Duke of Aquitaine briefly following the dukedom of Austrovald. Monlezun's reliance on the Charte d'Alaon makes it likely that this individual is spurious or misidentified.

Sources
Monlezun, Jean Justin. Histoire de la Gascogne. 1864.

References

Dukes of Aquitaine